Americium(III) iodide or americium triiodide is the chemical compound composed of americium and iodine with the formula AmI3.

Properties
Americium(III) iodide takes the form of yellow crystals. The crystal form is orthorhombic. It melts around 960 °C. The density is 6.9 g/cm3.

References

Americium compounds
Iodides
Actinide halides